Optus D3 is an Australian geostationary communications satellite, which is operated by Optus and provides communications services to Australasia. D3 was the third Optus-D satellite to be launched. It is a  satellite, which was constructed by Orbital Sciences Corporation based on the Star-2.4 satellite bus, with the same configuration as the earlier Optus D2 satellite.

It was launched, along with the Japanese JCSAT-12 satellite, by Arianespace. An Ariane 5ECA rocket was used for the launch, which occurred from ELA-3 at the Guiana Space Centre in Kourou, French Guiana. The launch took place at 22:09 GMT on 21 August 2009, at the start of a 60-minute launch window.

Optus D3 separated from its carrier rocket into a geosynchronous transfer orbit, from which it raised itself to geostationary orbit using an IHI -500-N apogee motor. It has a design life of fifteen years, and carries thirty two J band transponders (US IEEE Ku band).

See also

2009 in spaceflight

References

Optus
Communications satellite constellations
Satellites of Australia
Spacecraft launched in 2009
Satellites using the GEOStar bus